Turbo pustulatus is a species of sea snail, a marine gastropod mollusk in the family Turbinidae, the turban snails.

This has become a nomen dubium.

Description

Distribution
This marine species occurs in the Red Sea and in the Indian Ocean off Madagascar.

References

 Dautzenberg, Ph. (1929). Contribution à l'étude de la faune de Madagascar: Mollusca marina testacea. Faune des colonies françaises, III(fasc. 4). Société d'Editions géographiques, maritimes et coloniales: Paris. 321–636, plates IV-VII pp
 Mienis H.K. (2011) Remarks concerning Turbo pustulatus, Turbo pyropus and Collonia gestroi, with the description of Yaronia: a new genus for a small turbinid species from the Red Sea (Mollusca, Gastropoda, Turbinidae). Triton [Journal of the Israel Malacological Society] 23: 1–4.

External links
 Gastropods.com: Turbo (Turbo) pustulatus

pustulatus
Gastropods described in 1821